The South Korea national cricket team is the team that represents South Korea in international cricket. It is governed by the Korea Cricket Association, which became an affiliate member of the International Cricket Council (ICC) in 2001 and an associate member in June 2017. Their first international appearance to date was in the ICC East Asia/Pacific 8s tournament in Perth in 2002, where they came fourth in a tournament that also involved Japan, Indonesia and an Australian Aborigines team. They also competed in 2011 east Asia Pacific tournament.

In 2013 Arirang TV broadcast a documentary Bowling for Gold in their programme Arirang Prime on the Korean national cricket team as the 2014 Asian Games approached. The documentary highlighted their struggle to put together a national cricket team without any support from government agencies, their journeys to the 2011 ICC EAP Trophy Division 2 in Samoa making their international debut and winning their first match, rebuilding the national team two years later for the Asian Games and touring Chandigarh, Punjab, India as part of their preparations including playing against youth teams and training from Indian coaches. During their stay they also watched an IPL match at the Mohali Stadium and met some of the players such as Adam Gilchrist.

The team competed in 2014 Asian Games in Incheon as the host nation team, in which the team reached the quarter-final where they were defeated by the Sri Lankan cricket team. Matches were played at the purpose-built Yeonhui Cricket Ground in Incheon.

In 2016, the team competed in the inaugural East Asia Cup played among the four teams with Japan, China and Hong Kong Dragons being the other three teams. It was hosted by Japan Cricket Association at Sano International Cricket Ground. In the group stage South Korea won all their matches except the one against Japan. The tournament was won by South Korea after beating Japan in the final.

In April 2018, the ICC decided to grant full Twenty20 International (T20I) status to all its members. Therefore, all Twenty20 matches played between South Korea and other ICC members after 1 January 2019 will be a full T20I.

South Korea participated in the 2018–19 ICC World Twenty20 East Asia-Pacific Qualifier group B. This was the first round of qualification for the 2020 ICC World Twenty20 tournament which will be held in Australia. They finished in 2nd place behind the Philippines who qualified for the next round.

2011 East Asia-Pacific Division Two
South Korea took part in the 2011 ICC EAP Trophy Division 2 tournament from 4–7 April 2011 in Samoa. The tournament was part of a qualifying pyramid for the 2012 twenty-20 cricket world cup in Sri Lanka. The competing teams were as follows:

South Korea finished in 5th position (out of 6 teams) by winning their last match.

2014 Asian Games, Incheon
In 2014 South Korea participated, as the host nation, at the Asian Games T20 cricket tournament in Incheon, South Korea.
The competition was held at the newly built Yeonhui Cricket Ground in Incheon, Korea's first dedicated cricket facility.
Teams in the men's competition were as follows:

South Korea's squad for the 2014 Asian Games

Kim Kyungsik (Captain) – Bowler (RAM)
Hyobum An – Bowler (RAOS)
Suin Bang – WK & RHB
Inho Cha – Bowler (RAOS)
Sunghoon Cho – Batsman (RH)
Jiwon Choi – All-rounder (RAM/RHB)
Youmin Jung – Batsman (RH)
Hongki Kim – Bowler (RAOS)
Namheon Kim – Bowler (LAOS)
Sangwook Lee – Batsman (RH)
Hwanhee Lee – Bowler (RAOS)
Soochan Park – Batsman (LH)
Park Tae Kwan- Bowler (LAFM)
Ilhwan Seo – Batsman (RH)
Sung Dae Sik – Batsman (RH)

South Korea's results were as follows:

Game 1, South Korea v Malaysia (Malaysia won by 8 wickets)

Game 2, South Korea v China (South Korea won by 6 Runs)

QF, South Korea v Sri Lanka (Sri Lanka won by 117 Runs)

East Asia Cup
2015: 4th place
2016: Won
2018: 4th place

2018–19 ICC World Twenty20 East Asia-Pacific Qualifier

South Korea competed in the 2018–19 ICC World Twenty20 East Asia-Pacific Qualifier for the first time since 2011. They proved that they are an up-and-coming cricket nation by finishing second above Japan who are the 2018 EAP champions and Indonesia who won the bronze medal at the 2017 Southeast Asian Games. This was a huge stepping stone for Korea.

Records

International Match Summary — South Korea
 
Last updated 18 October 2022

Twenty20 International 

T20I record versus other nations

Records complete to T20I #1831. Last updated 18 October 2022.

See also
Korea Cricket Association
South Korea national women's cricket team
Yeonhui Cricket Ground
East Asia-Pacific

References

External links
 

Cricket in South Korea
Korea, South
Cricket
South Korea in international cricket